Carlos Miguel Brandão Fernandes (born 5 May 1978) is a Portuguese retired footballer who played as a left-back.

He amassed Primeira Liga totals of 272 games and 13 goals over 15 seasons, mainly in representation of Farense and Braga (three years apiece). He started his professional career with Sporting CP.

Club career
Fernandes was born in Lisbon. During his professional career, the unsuccessful product of Sporting CP's youth system represented, among other clubs, C.F. Os Belenenses and Boavista FC, having made his Primeira Liga debut with S.C. Farense in 1999. In mid-January 2006 he joined S.C. Braga, appearing in seven UEFA Cup matches over the course of his two full seasons.

In July 2008, Fernandes signed with C.S. Marítimo, which had just qualified for the UEFA Cup. He was released in late January 2009, moving in July to S.C. Olhanense which in turn had returned to the top division after 34 years.

In the subsequent top-flight campaign, Fernandes was first-choice left-back and also scored twice. On 12 December 2009, he opened the score at home against S.L. Benfica in an eventual 2–2 draw; Olhanense also managed to stay up, after finishing in 13th position.

References

External links

1978 births
Living people
Portuguese footballers
Footballers from Lisbon
Association football defenders
Primeira Liga players
Liga Portugal 2 players
Segunda Divisão players
Sporting CP footballers
S.C. Campomaiorense players
S.C. Farense players
C.F. Os Belenenses players
Boavista F.C. players
S.C. Braga players
C.S. Marítimo players
S.C. Olhanense players
Associação Naval 1º de Maio players
Portugal youth international footballers
Portugal under-21 international footballers
Portugal B international footballers
Portuguese football managers